The Mandate for Mesopotamia was a proposed League of Nations mandate to cover Ottoman Iraq (Mesopotamia). It would have been entrusted to the United Kingdom but was superseded by the Anglo-Iraqi Treaty, an agreement between Britain and Iraq with some similarities to the proposed mandate. On paper, the mandate lasted from 1920 to 1932.

The proposed mandate was awarded on 25 April 1920 at the San Remo Conference, in Italy, in accordance with the 1916 Sykes–Picot Agreement but was not yet documented or defined. It was to be a class A mandate under Article 22 of the Covenant of the League of Nations. A draft mandate document was prepared by the British Colonial Office in June 1920 and submitted in draft form to the League of Nations in December 1920.

Immediately after the end of the First World War, Sir Arnold Wilson, the future High Commissioner to Iraq, recommended the annexation of Mesopotamia to India "as a colony of India and the Indians, such as the government of India administer it and gradually cultivate its vast plains, and settle the warrior Punjab races in it".
 In a memorandum written on 22 April 1918, Cox listed the social groups that the British should support: the Jewish community in Baghdad, the notables in Baghdad and Basara, the rich landowning Arabs and Jews, and the Shaikhs of sedentary tribes. Mosul was added to the region of British influence following the 1918 Clemenceau–Lloyd George Agreement.

The proposed mandate faced certain difficulties to be established, as a nationwide Iraqi revolt broke out in 1920 after which it was decided the territory would become the Kingdom of Iraq, via the Anglo-Iraq Treaty of October 1922. The Kingdom of Iraq became independent in 1931–1932, in accordance with the League of Nations stance, which stated such states would be facilitated into "progressive development" as fully-independent states.

The civil government of British-administered Iraq was headed originally by the High Commissioner, Sir Percy Cox, and his deputy, Colonel Arnold Wilson. British reprisals after the murder of a British officer in Najaf failed to restore order. British administration had yet to be established in the mountains of northern Iraq. The most striking problem facing the British was the growing anger of the nationalists, who felt betrayed at being accorded mandate status.

Maps

Further reading
 Dodge, Toby "Inventing Iraq" (2009)
 Fieldhouse, David K. Western Imperialism in the Middle East, 1914–1958 (2006)
 Fisk, Robert. The Great War for Civilisation: The Conquest of the Middle East, (2nd ed. 2006),
 Simons, Geoff. Iraq: From Sumer to Saddam (2nd ed. 1994)
 Sluglett, Peter. Britain in Iraq: Contriving King and Country, 1914–1932 (2nd ed. 2007)

References

British Mandate for Mesopotamia
Iraq–United Kingdom relations
British colonisation of Asia
League of Nations mandates
Mandatory Iraq
1920 documents